St Andrew's Presbyterian Church is a Presbyterian church at Raglan Street, a suburb of Sydney, New South Wales, Australia.

The foundation stone for the church was laid in 1889. Designed by Sir John Sulman, the church is recognized as being one of the best examples of the Romanesque building style in Australia. It was later renovated under government grant in 1960 to include a school building addition in the rear of the property.

References

External links 
 

Manly
Manly, New South Wales
1890 establishments in Australia
Churches completed in 1890
Romanesque Revival church buildings in Australia
Victorian architecture in Sydney
John Sulman buildings